The Squeeze Box is an illusion designed and originally performed by André Kole.

Effect 
A person (the magician or the assistant) enters a horizontal box and extends their head out one end and their feet out of the other. A wheel is spun, squeezing both ends of the box towards the middle until the person's head is right next to their feet. The feet move throughout the effect and the person's hands can be shown out the top of the box. The box is stretched back out and the person emerges unharmed.

Notable performances 
 André Kole
 David Copperfield
 Siegfried and Roy

Magic tricks